Echinocactus texensis (also known as the horse crippler or devil's pincushion) is a cactus in the subfamily Cactoideae. It is endemic to the United States and Mexico.  It has one synonym.

References

External links 
 

Plants described in 1842
texensis